Hangaza is a Bantu language spoken by the Hangaza people of Tanzania. It is closely related to and partially intelligible with the languages of Rwanda and Burundi.

References

Languages of Tanzania
Rwanda-Rundi languages